Justin Germain Casimir de Selves (19 July 1848 in Toulouse – 12 January 1934 in Paris) was a French politician.

He held an officer rank in the Franco-Prussian war.  He was Director-General of Posts and Telegraphs from 1890 to 1896. He became a senator from Tarn-et-Garonne in 1909.  He was Prefect of the Department of the Seine for fifteen years, giving up the post when he was appointed Foreign Minister, on 26 June 1911.  He resigned the position on 9 January 1912 after refusing to confirm to President Clemenceau statements made by Premier Caillaux.  From 1924 to 1927 he was President of the Senate, but lost his seat in 1927 to a Radical Socialist.

References 

1848 births
1934 deaths
Politicians from Toulouse
Politicians of the French Third Republic
French Senators of the Third Republic
Presidents of the Senate (France)
Grand Officiers of the Légion d'honneur
Honorary Knights Grand Cross of the Royal Victorian Order
French interior ministers
Senators of Tarn-et-Garonne